Calvin Thomas may refer to:

 Calvin Thomas (actor) (1885–1964), American actor
 Calvin Thomas (critical theorist), American professor of critical theory, modern and postmodern literature and culture
 Calvin Thomas (director) (born 1986), Canadian filmmaker
 Calvin Thomas (linguist) (1854–1919), American scholar, and professor of Germanic languages
 Cal Thomas (born 1942), columnist and former Vice President of the Moral Majority
 Calvin Thomas (American football) (born 1960), former professional American football player 
 Cal Thomas (American football) (1915–1982), professional football player
 Calvin Thomas, Yoshukai Karate practitioner